Basim may refer to:

Places
Washim, an Indian city in the state of Maharashtra with Basim being an alternative name

People
Basim (singer) (Anis Basim Moujahid, born 1992), a Moroccan-Danish singer
Basim Bello, a mayor in Iraq
Basim Qasim (born 1959), an Iraqi football manager
Bassim Al-Karbalaei (born 1966), a Shia eulogy reciter
Basim Al-Rajaibi (born 1992), an Omani footballer 
Basim Elkarra, an American civil rights leader
Basim Shami (born 1976), a businessman and philanthropist

See also

Bassem, a given name
Bassam (disambiguation)